Bleepsgr (or Bleeps) is the pseudonym used by V.(M.) Kakouris, who is a Greek artist. He creates political street art, paintings and installations; he is associated with the artivism movement. Much of his street art is in Athens, but his paintings are also to be found in other parts of Greece, and more widely in Europe.

History
Bleeps was born in Peristeri district, which is located in the West Bank of Athens circa 1980 and he grew up in a low - mid class environment.

Bleeps started creating street art while he was in Bristol, UK, between 2003 and 2005, where he became familiar with the local underground scene.

Style and themes
Most of Bleeps' street art projects derive elements from conceptual art, folk art and various past art movements, while the protagonists depicted are associated with Bleeps' interpretation of social life.

His stated goal is to examine systemic figures such as religion, politics, monetary system and consumerism.

Financial crisis
Since the beginning of the Greek financial crisis in 2008, Bleeps has been creating a series of works related to the crisis' impact on ordinary people and the lower middle class, globally and in his country, in the form of critical discourse.

Bibliography

Selected Media Publications
 International Herald Tribune, (The Global Edition of the New York Times), p. 1 (Cover Photo), p. 3 (Interview), 15–16 October 2011.
 Financial Times DEUTSCHLAND, p. 28, 22 November 2011.

References

External links

Pseudonymous artists
Anti-consumerists
Culture jamming
Greek artists
Conceptual art
Street artists
Greek graffiti artists
Political artists
Artists from Athens